The Southern Africa-Indian Ocean Division (SID) of Seventh-day Adventists is a sub-entity of the General Conference of Seventh-day Adventists, which coordinates the Church's activities in the southern portion of Africa, which include the nations of Angola, Ascension Island, Botswana, Comoro Islands, Lesotho, Madagascar, Malawi, Mauritius, Mozambique, Namibia, Réunion, São Tomé and Príncipe, Seychelles, South Africa, Swaziland, Zambia, Zimbabwe; as well as St. Helena and Tristan da Cunha, territories of the United Kingdom, and the Kerguelen Islands, territory of France.  Its headquarters is in Centurion, South Africa. The Division membership as of June 30, 2021 is 4,281,416.

Sub Fields

The Southern Africa-Indian Ocean Division is divided into nine Union Conferences, three Union Missions, and one attached Mission.  These are divided into local Conferences, Missions, and Fields.

 Botswana Union Conference 
 North Botswana Conference
 South Botswana Conference
 Indian Ocean Union Conference 
 Central Malagasy Conference 
 East Malagasy Conference 
 Mauritius Conference
 North Malagasy Conference 
 North West Malagasy Conference 
 Reunion Conference 
 Seychelles Mission 
 South East Malagasy Conference 
 South West Malagasy Conference
 Malawi Union Conference
 Central Malawi Conference
 North Malawi Conference
 South Malawi Conference
 Mozambique Union Mission 
 Central Mission
 North Mission
 North-East Mission
 South Mission
 North-Eastern Angola Union Mission
 Angola East Mission
Angola North Mission
Angola North-Eastern Mission
Angola South Luanda and Cabinda Mission
 Northern Zambia Union Conference 
 Copperbelt Zambia Conference
 Luapula Zambia Conference
 Midlands East Zambia Conference
 Midlands West Zambia Conference
 Northwest Zambia Conference
 North Zambia Field
 South Africa Union Conference 
 Cape Conference 
 KwaZulu Natal-Free State Conference 
 Lesotho Conference 
 Namibia North Conference
 Namibia South Conference
 Northern Conference
 Swaziland Conference 
 Trans-Orange Conference 
 Southern Zambia Union Conference 
 East Zambia Field
 Lusaka Conference
 South Zambia Conference 
 West Zambia Field
 Woodlands Conference
 South-Western Angola Union Mission 
 Central Association Mission
 South Association Mission
 Zimbabwe Central Union Conference 
 Central Zimbabwe Conference 
 North-West Zimbabwe Confeence 
 Zimbabwe East Union Conference 
 East Zimbabwe Conference 
 North Zimbabwe Conference
 Zimbabwe West Union Conference 
 South Zimbabwe Conference 
 West Zimbabwe Conference 
São Tomé and Principe Mission

History

See also
Seventh-day Adventist Church
List of Seventh-day Adventist hospitals
List of Seventh-day Adventist secondary schools
List of Seventh-day Adventist colleges and universities

References

History of the Seventh-day Adventist Church
Southern